American Health may refer to:

American Health (magazine), a defunct magazine
American Health (company), a manufacturer of nutritional supplements